Azaleodes megaceros is a moth of the family Palaephatidae. It has only been found in Australia at the Dorrigo National Park and localities near Coffs Harbour in New South Wales.

External links
Australian Faunal Directory
Image at CSIRO Entomology
Moths of Australia

Moths of Australia
Palaephatidae
Moths described in 1987